He Is Na Dog, He Is A Lam is a poem by William Dunbar addressed to Queen Margaret Tudor of Scotland.

The theme of the poem follows on from the same author's work "Of James Dog" in which Dunbar had complained about the allegedly rude behaviour of the Queen's servant of the same name. James Dog was referred to as "A dangerous dog".

In He Is Na Dog, He Is A Lam Dunbar declares to have renounced his former opinions of the "dangerous dog" because, apparently, he has been helpful to the poet. James Dog is subsequently compared to a lamb.

However, for reasons which are not explained, it is clear that Dunbar's change of heart is insincere. While praising Dog extravagantly for his good nature and helpfulness the poet introduces new insults which are far more offensive than the previous ones.

The text of the poem is found in the Maitland Folio Manuscript where it is entitled "Of the Aforesaid James Dog" and has the postscript "Quod Dunbar of the said James quhen he had plesett him".

The Poem
Dunbar appeals to the Queen to treat his "faithful brother" well.

He asserts that, although he joked with James Dog in verse, no malice was intended. He merely wanted to entertain the Queen.

He dispenses more praise for Dog.

Then with mock sympathy for the man he has just praised he prays that Dog's wife, who supposedly beats her husband, should be "drowned in a dam."

Mrs. Dog, who is also unfaithful to her husband, should be "thoroughly beaten with a rail".

Dunbar then seamlessly returns to his praise of the "obedient" James Dog and so concludes the poem.

References

Scottish poems
Poetry by William Dunbar
Scottish literature
16th-century poems
1500s in Scotland
Court of James IV of Scotland